The wildlife of Ukraine consists of its diverse fauna, flora and funga. The reported fauna consists of 45,000 species when including the areas of the Black Sea and the Sea of Azov. Biosphere nature reserves and three national parks are all part of the GEF projects portfolio of conservation of biodiversity in the Danube Delta. Their vegetation pattern is mixed forest area, forest-steppe area, steppe area, Ukrainian Carpathian Mountains and Crimean Mountains. Some of the protected areas that were reserves or parks are subsumed under the biosphere reserves.

The isolated or abandoned zone caused by the Chornobyl nuclear power station disaster around the city of Chornobyl, while evacuated of all human habitation, has an abundance of wildlife which is reported to be increasing. However, reports indicate that bird's brains are 5% smaller, and the insect and spider population is in decline.

Geography

A synopsis of Ukraine's faunal and flora history was noted in Stephen Rudnicki's Ukraine, the Land and Its People: An Introduction to Its Geography (1912): "Ukraine has a much more varied plant and animal geography than the proper Russian territory, despite the latter's much greater extent. In Ukraine, the borders of three main divisions of plant-geography of Europe meet—the Mediterranean division, the steppe region, and the forest region, with their transition regions. Besides, we meet in Ukraine three mountain regions—the Carpathian. In respect to flora, Ukraine possesses only a few endemic species".

"To be sure the great ice period covered only comparatively small areas of Ukraine with its glacier, but the polar flora undoubtedly prevailed in the entire country at that time. After the withdrawal of the glacier, steppes first appeared in its place, which then, especially in the Northwest, were forced to make room for a forest flora that had immigrated from Central Europe and Siberia. Hence, despite the considerable area of Ukraine, so few endemic species. Since those primeval days, only a very few natural changes have occurred in the vegetation of Ukraine. However, man, through his cultural activity, has wrought many changes in the plant-world of the country."

Ecoregions
Ukraine contains six terrestrial ecoregions: Central European mixed forests, Crimean Submediterranean forest complex, East European forest steppe, Pannonian mixed forests, Carpathian montane conifer forests, and Pontic steppe.

Flora

Ukraine's climate influences the country's distinctive forest stands. Deciduous trees make up 52% with the balance being coniferous. The most densely forested area of Ukraine is in the northwest in Polisia where pine, oak, and birch are the main tree species. In the north-central area, where the forest-steppe belt is located, the main species are oak, pine, and hornbeam. In the southeast area, the steppe-belt is situated, oak and pine are the main species. 
Mountainous areas are characterized by three zones: lower slopes contain mixed forests, higher elevations contain pine forests, and the highest altitudes contain alpine meadows. In the Carpathian Mountains, beech, oak, and spruce are the main trees, while in the Crimean Mountains, beech and oak form the largest numbers. Along the southern Crimean peninsular coast, the vegetation is characterized by maquis shrubland and deciduous and evergreen Mediterranean plants such as olive trees, cypress trees, oleander shrubs, pine trees, junipers and palm trees.

Fauna

There are 45,000 faunal species reported. Mammal species number about 108, birds number about 400 species (350 is also mentioned), there are 21 species of reptiles, fish (including subspecies) number about 170 (200 is also mentioned), and amphibians number 17 species. There are about 35,000 species of invertebrates which include insects (of which 12 species are reported  endemic). The Carpathian and the Crimea region are the dominant habitats of endemic species. Some of the faunal taxon reported by Animal Diversity Web are the European ground squirrel (Spermophilus citellus), European bison (Bison bonasus), European shag (Phalacrocorax aristotelis), steppe polecat (Mustela eversmanii) and Eurasian elk (Alces alces).

A wide variety of birds are found in Ukraine, those reported including game birds, nighthawks, raptors, song birds, swifts, waders, and waterfowl. Some of the bird species noted are black grouse, hazel grouse, gull, owl, and partridges. There are also migratory ducks, storks, and wild geese. The number of migratory birds is reported as 100 species.

Mammals include Eurasian elk, fox, marten, mouflon, roe deer, wildcat, wild pig, wolf, mice, and jerboas. Some of the fish species recorded include perch, pike, sterlet, and sturgeon.

Aqua fauna of the Black Sea, the Sea of Azov and estuary have 32 animal species which belong to the Pontic–Caspian steppe region.

There are approximately 385 endangered species listed in the Red Book of Ukraine. These are made up of 41 mammals, 67 birds, 8 amphibians and reptiles, 32 fish, 173 insects, 12 mollusks, 26 cancroid, 7 annelida, 3 centipedes, 2 nematodes, 2 hydro polyps and 2 chubby-faced.

Ukraine falls into two main zoological areas. One of these, in the west of the country, is made up of the borderlands of Europe, where there are species typical of mixed forests, the other is located in eastern Ukraine, where steppe-dwelling species thrive. In the forested areas of the country, it is not uncommon to find lynxes, wolves, wild boars and martens.

This is especially true of the Carpathian Mountains, where many predatory mammals, such as brown bears, make their home. Around Ukraine's lakes and rivers beavers, otters and mink make their home, whilst in the waters carp, bream and catfish are the most commonly found species of fish. In the central and eastern parts of the country, rodents such as hamsters and gophers are found in large numbers.

Fungi 
More than 6,600 species of fungi (including lichen-forming species) have been recorded from Ukraine, but this number is far from complete. The true total of fungal species occurring in Ukraine, including species not yet recorded, is likely to be far higher, given the generally accepted estimate that only about 7% of all fungi worldwide have so far been discovered. Although the amount of available information is still very small, a first effort has been made to estimate the number of fungal species endemic to Ukraine, and 2,217 such species have been tentatively identified.

Conservation
 
Conservation effort is through 33 Ramsar Wetlands of International Importance which cover 7,446.51 square kilometres, three biosphere reserves and three national parks.

Ramsar wetlands

The 33 wetlands inscribed under Ramsar Convention from 1994 till 2013 are the: Aquatic cliff complex of Cape Kazantyp (2004, 251 ha), Aquatic cliff complex of Karadag (2004, 224 ha), Aquatic coastal complex of Cape Opuk (2004, 775 ha), Bakotska Bay (2004, 1,590 ha), Berda River Mouth and Berdianka Spit and Berdianska Bay (1995, 1,800 ha), Big Chapelsk Depression (2004, 2,359 ha), Bilosaraiska Bay and Bilosaraiska Spit (1995, 2,000 ha), Central Syvash (1995, 80,000 ha), Desna River Floodplains (2004, 4,270 ha), Dniester Turunchuk Crossrivers Area (1995, 76,000 ha), Dnipro Oril Floodplains (2004, 2,560 ha), Dnipro River Delta (1995, 26,000 ha), Eastern Syvash (1995, 165,000 ha), Karkinitska and Dzharylgatska Bays (1995, 87,000 ha), Kartal Lake (1995, 500 ha), Kryva Bay and Kryva Spit (1995, 1,400 ha), Kugurlui Lake (1995, 6,500 ha), Kyliiske Mouth (1995, 32,800 ha), Lake Synevyr (2004, 29 ha), Lower Smotrych River (2004, 1,480 ha), Molochnyi Liman (1995, 22,400 ha), Northern Part of the Dniester Liman (1995, 20,000 ha), Obytochna Spit and Obytochna Bay (1995, 2,000 ha), Perebrody Peatlands (2004, 12,718 ha), Polissia Mires (2004, 2,145 ha), Prypiat River Floodplains  (1995, 12,000 ha), Sasyk Lake (1995, 21,000 ha), Shagany Alibei Burnas Lakes System (1995, 19,000 ha), Burnas Lakes System (1995, 19,000 ha), Shatsk Lakes (1995, 32,850 ha), Stokhid River Floodplains (1995, 10,000 ha),  Tendrivska Bay (1995, 38,000 ha), Tyligulskyi Liman (1995, 26,000 ha), and Yagorlytska Bay  (1995, 34,000 ha).

Biosphere reserves
Among the nature reserves established under the UNESCO World Network of Biosphere Reserves, the three reserves are the Danubian Biosphere Reserve covering the Lower Danube - Kyliiske Mouth, the Black Sea Biosphere Reserve covering a portion of the Black Sea - Tendrivska Bay and Yagorlytska Bay, and the Crimea Nature Reserve in a portion of the Karkinitskaya and Dzharylgatskaya Bays.

National parks
The national parks are the Azovo-Syvaskyi National Nature Park, the Regional Landscape Park "Meotida", and the Azovo-Syvaskyi National Nature Park.

See also
List of birds of Ukraine
List of fish in Ukraine
List of Lepidoptera of Ukraine
List of mammals of Ukraine
List of non-marine molluscs of Ukraine

References

Sources

External links

Biota of Ukraine
Ukraine
Fauna of Ukraine
Flora of Ukraine